XHVER-FM is a noncommercial radio station on 90.9 FM in Veracruz, Veracruz, Mexico. It is owned by Simón Valanci Buzali and is known as Bella Música.

History
XHVER received its permit on November 1, 2011.

References

Radio stations in Veracruz
Radio stations established in 2011
2011 establishments in Mexico
Spanish-language radio stations